An online streamer or live streamer is a person who broadcasts themselves online through a live stream to an audience.

History 
Streaming arose in the early 2010s, originating on sites like YouTube where users could upload videos of themselves in the form of vlogs or Let's Plays. While not all content featured a live audience, users were still able to gain a sizable following and make a living off of their content. Other sites like Twitch increased this popularity. Due to the millions of dollars that streamers can make, streaming has become a much-yearned-for career option.

Genre

Video games
Let's Players have been the most popular streamers by far since the beginning of live streaming. Today, the majority of streamers make their living from doing Let's Plays, live speedruns, and walkthroughs of video games. The biggest video game streamers are PewDiePie and Ninja who make millions of dollars each year just from streaming.

IRL streams

While the majority of professional and part-time streamers play video games, many often do IRL (in real life) streams where they broadcast their daily life. At first, many streaming sites prohibited non-gaming live streams as they thought it would harm the quality of the content on their sites but the demand for non-gaming content grew. Topics include answering questions in front of a computer, streaming from their phone while walking outside, or even doing tutorials. IRL streams are alternatives to viewers who do not necessarily like to play video games.

Virtual avatar

Virtual avatars, commonly known as VTubers, are a branch of streaming in which virtual avatars, occasionally paired with voice changers, are used instead of the streamer's face. There are multiple companies focused on the promotion, support and merchandising of VTuber talent, including Nijisanji and Hololive Production. In 2020 alone, there were more than 10,000 active VTubers.

Pornographic streaming

Pornographic streams are a way to directly communicate with porn stars. Camgirls and camboys broadcast while nude or performing sexual acts often on demand from viewers. Sites like Plexstorm have created a niche by streaming video gamers performing or showing sexual content including pornographic games.

By nations
Asia has become a big marketplace, especially in South Korea and China. For example:

South Korea

Broadcast jockey
In South Korea, a streamer is called a broadcast jockey or BJ. Broadcast jockeys have become popular over the years in Korea thanks in part to many of them being more relatable to viewers than some celebrities and becoming famous enough to appear on TV shows. While it is common for broadcast jockeys to become national stars, there has been a recent rise in the number of famous Korean idols and celebrities becoming broadcast jockeys either as a way to supplement their career or full-time as they make more money streaming than they would acting or singing. The number of famous stars becoming full-time broadcast jockeys has outpaced the number of part-timers as many prefer freedom over professional offers. Politicians have streaming channels. Korean sites include AfreecaTV, Naver TV, and KakaoTV in addition to worldwide streaming sites like Twitch, YouTube, and Bigo Live.

Mukbang

Mukbang originated in South Korea, as the live-streaming of eating a meal. Global sites like Twitch offer "Social Eating".

China
China has become the largest marketplace for live streaming. A large number of streamers make $10,000–$100,000 a month without having to be a big name on the Internet. This is due to the large population and the ubiquity of smartphones, where many Chinese citizens prefer to consume their entertainment. The live streaming market grew 180% in 2016 and has grown even more since then. Chinese streaming sites may be restricted to Chinese content and audiences due to the strict Internet rules in the country and the difficulty of cooperating with the Chinese Communist Party. Many Chinese streamers average 100,000 viewers per stream and earn $29,000 per month just by partnering with an agency.

Influencer marketing

See also
 Lifecasting
 Livestreaming
 Streaming media
 VTuber
 YouTuber

References

New media
Internet broadcasting
 
Broadcasting occupations